Philip Conkling is the founder and former president of the Island Institute, a membership-based nonprofit organization located in Rockland, Maine that serves as a voice for the balanced future of the islands and waters of the Gulf of Maine, especially the 15 year-round island communities along the Maine coast. Conkling also serves as an alternate commissioner of the Roosevelt Campobello International Park, and is on the Maine state board of the Conservation Law Foundation. He lives in the small coastal town of Camden, Maine.

Written works
  The Fate of Greenland: Lessons from Abrupt Climate Change (2011) co-authored with Richard Alley, Wallace Broecker and George Denton, with photographs by Gary Comer MIT Press
  Lobsters Great and Small-How Fishermen and Scientists are Changing Our Understanding of a Maine Icon (2001)
  He also is the editor of From Cape Cod to the Bay of Fundy-An Environmental Atlas of the Gulf of Maine (1995).
  Islands in Time, A Natural and Cultural History of the Islands of the Gulf of Maine (published first in 1981, revised in 1999, with a new, expanded edition published in 2011)
 Green Islands Green Sea: A Guide to Foraging on the Islands of Maine (1980)
 "Along the Archipelago"

See also
Greenland ice sheet

References

American company founders
Harvard University alumni
Yale School of Forestry & Environmental Studies alumni
Living people
Year of birth missing (living people)